Hof is a town on the banks of the Saale in the northeastern corner of the German state of Bavaria, in the Franconian region, at the Czech border and the forested Fichtelgebirge and Frankenwald upland regions.
The town has 47,296 inhabitants, the surrounding district an additional 95,000.

The town of Hof is enclosed by, but does not belong to the Bavarian district of Hof; it is nonetheless the district's administrative seat.

The town's most important work of art, the Hofer altar, dates from about 1465 and is exhibited in the Alte Pinakothek in Munich today. The Heidenreich organ in the parish church of St. Michaelis, completed in 1834, is considered one of Bavaria's finest.

Hof is known for two local "delicacies", namely , a kind of hotpot, and sausages boiled in a portable, coal-fired brass cauldron, which are sold in the streets by the sausage man ( in the local dialect). There is also a particularly strong beer, which is available only on the first Monday after Trinity Sunday (Schlappentag). This tradition dates back to the establishment of the town militia which forced all shooters to take part in a special shooting training each year. To avoid penalties, a lot of shooters rushed out to the training area in the morning of the last possible day, without even enough time to get dressed and thus still wearing their clogs.

The Hof Theatre (Theater Hof) is a multi-purpose theatre whose construction was completed in 1994. It serves as an opera house and drama theatre, and hosts the city's ballet company and a youth theatre. The Hofer Symphoniker, Hof's symphony orchestra, plays as opera orchestra at the theatre and gives concerts at the Freiheitshalle Hof.

Geography

Administrative divisions 
The town of Hof consists of the following districts in particular:

Surroundings 
Hof is located in between the areas of the Frankenwald (Franconian Forest), the Fichtelgebirge and the Vogtland.

History

Roman Period 
 
It is assumed then that Hof was the place where the chief(s) of the Varisci (or Narisci) tribe of the Suebi people held court (and/or perhaps a pagan temple or hall). The Varisci appear briefly in Tacitus' Germania (Chapter 42) as participants in the Marcomannic Wars. Their chief, Valao, was killed during battle around 167 AD and it is possible that these ancient peoples were then transplanted to Italy by Marcus Aurelius and lost their identity. A few centuries later (4th or 5th century) the obscure Armalausi peoples appear where the Varisci once lived, however the Latin name of  stuck to the region. This is evidenced by nearby Plauen being called Plavia Variscorum and Hof: Curia Variscorum. The name  has been used to denote the city of Hof in numerous documents and publications throughout the years.

Sorbish-Frankish Conflicts (c. 600 – 1080) 
Sometime around the 6th century AD the Slavic Sorbs began arriving near the Saale River which runs through Hof. They are first mentioned in 631 A.D., when Fredegar’s Chronicle described them as "Surbi" and as under the rule of a Dervan, an ally of Samo. The Frankish Kingdom of Charlemagne and his descendants were determined to Christianize the pagan Slavs and various campaigns were waged against them. The Annales Regni Francorum state that in 806 A.D. Sorbian Duke Miliduch fought against the Franks and was killed by Charles the Younger the son of Charlemagne around nearby modern-day Weißenfels.

The region where Hof is located first came under the ecclesiastic control of the Dioceses of Würzburg during this time period. Then in 1007 the region which contains Hof came under the Bishopric of Bamberg which was established out of the Dioceses of Würzburg to further spread Christianity throughout this area.

While the area around Hof remained terra incognita during this time period it was not isolated from the rest of the world. Although not home to a king or prince, Hof was on located on a somewhat protected, and very important trade route; the Via Imperii. This route led from Italy to the Baltic Sea and Hof was well situated to be a place of rest for travelers and traders as the flourishing markets of Leipzig, Zwickau, and Nuremberg began to develop. The budding mining industry of silver and tin from the nearby Erzgebirge would also contribute to the development of trade in this region.

Andechs-Merania and Vögte of Weida (1080 – 1373) 
It appears that the missionary efforts of Bamberg were fairly successful in Hof as sometime around 1080 a group of farmers (possibly Sorbish) settled parts of modern-day Hof had built a chapel on Klausenberg an der Saale. They called their settlement "Rekkenze" which appears to be derived from the Western Slavic word  meaning "river." Rekkenze was first mentioned in a document written by one Pastor Albertus of St. Lorenzkirche in 1214 to the Bishop of Bamberg.

The Slavic language has left many marks on the geography of this region and to this day there are two waterways known as "Regnitz" near Hof: the Upper/Southern Regnitz (which flows in the south of Hof on the east side of the Saale River) and the Lower/Northern Regnitz (which flows in the north and east side of the Saale). Also of note, the area around Hof, the southern Bavarian-Bohemian part of the Vogtland, was known as the Regnitzland.

Rekkenze and other historic names of Hof
This Rekkenze settlement, which later became Hof, went by this and many other names through the years. It has been suggested that the name "Hof" is the shortened form of  meaning "City on the Court at the Regnitz".

House of Andechs-Merania 
In 1098 Count Berthold II of Andechs inherited his father's lands including those in modern-day Upper Franconia. In the 1130s he built Plassenburg Castle in Kulmbach and from 1137 he styled himself as 'Count of Plassenburg". He thus strengthened his influence in and around the nearby Regnitzland.

Vögte of Weida 

By 1248 the royal house of Andechs-Merania dies out with Duke Otto II. Soon after the Vögte of Weida acquired the Regnitzland including Hof. Vogt Henry VIII of Weida (1258–1279) earned the city of Hof and Regnitzland. He was married to Sophie, daughter of Count Hermann II of Orlamünde and Beatrix of Andechs-Merania (daughter of Count Otto I).

Under the guidance of the Vögte of Weida the first city wall and the foundation of the poor hospital (Armenspitals) were built (c. 1260). Also, in 1270 there is the first mention of a castle at Hof and in 1278 the beginnings of the Klarissenkloster was established under the aid of the Vogt. The Convent was blessed by the first Franciscan Pope Nicholas IV in 1291 and came under the Franciscan Monastery of the Holy Cross in 1292.

In 1299 75% of the city (both Old and New Hof) was destroyed by a fire and the population was left destitute. It took over 30 years to rebuild Hof, however during the rebuilding process (1319) the Vogt Heinrich XII the Younger (der Jüngere) of Weida (1302–1324) confirmed traditional rights and privileges upon the City of Hof. These rights officially made Hof a city.

In 1373, Vogt Heinrich XVI of Weida sold the Regnitzland to Burgrave Friedrich V of Nürnberg. However, due to this early history with the Vögte of Weida, Hof is still considered part of the geographical region known as the Vogtland. The name of the Museum Bayerisches Vogtland in Hof today also pays homage to this history.

Brandenburg Period (1373 – 1792) 
Burgrave Friedrich V died on January 21, 1398, and his lands were split between his two sons, Johann III and Friedrich IV, thus creating what has been called the Principality of Bayreuth.

Hussite Wars (1419 – 1434) 
Close to the end of the Hussite Wars (between the 4th and 5th Crusade against them) Hof was sacked by the Hussite followers of Jan Hus. In 1430, during the period the Hussites called the Spanilé jízdy (or "beautiful rides") they raided and devastated the city of Hof. on the 25th of January they burnt Plauen and then turned their attention to Hof. From the end of January into February they attacked and finally broke through killing many Hofers and looted and burned Hof. They also took away inhabitants of Hof as booty.

Rebuilding of Hof 
In 1432 a militia was organized to defend Hof. The organization of this Shooter's Guild is still celebrated in Hof annually in festival called Schlappentag [see description above].

in 1464 the Hospital and Hospital Church (Hospitalkirche) were rebuilt.

1487 a foundation in Niclaskirche for pilgrims on the Jacobsweg was built near the modern day St. Marienkirche. Jacobsweg is part of the famous Camino de Santiago which ends in at Cathedral of Santiago de Compostela in Galicia, Spain. There is a plaque on the wall of Marienkirche that commemorates this pilgrim inn that is now lost.

In 1498 a watch tower was constructed to add to the defenses of Hof.

Reformation 

While 1517 brought the 95 Theses, the spark that ignited the Protestant Reformation, in Hof 1517 sparked a terrible fire that destroyed some 50 homes around the Orlaplatz and St. Michaeliskirche, severely damaging the rectory. The various churches and chapels in Hof at this time were all under the head pastor of Hof, Margrave Friedrich von Brandenburg of the Hohenzollern family. This family often fought amongst themselves during the reformation using religion to gain political power. Friedrich tended to side with the Catholic Church against his brother George "the Pious" who used the new Protestant religion to his advantage.

In 1524, a reforming priest named Kaspar Löhner was reassigned from his preaching position at Kloster Birkenfeld, after complaints from the Abbess, and brought to Hof under Head Pastor Friedrich v. Brandenburg. Löhner had been performing Mass in German and singing German songs during the Mass. He arrived in Hof where his preaching continued to carry a certain reformation flavor. This is understandable given that he was a friend of Martin Luther who had accompanied him from Wittenberg and Augsburg in 1518.

Soon after Löhner arrived in Hof the radical lay-preacher from Zwickau, Nikolaus Storch, also arrived in Hof. According to the Hof chronicler Enoch Widmann, Storch was in Hof at the end of 1524 working as a weaver, but still preaching and gaining followers. Previously a co-worker with Thomas Müntzer, Storch is also considered a forerunner of the Anabaptist movement, because Widmann recorded him as having preached and practiced adult baptism in Hof. This was opposed by Löhner and others in Hof and towards the end of January in 1525 he applied to the mayor of Zwickau to be allowed to return there. This was refused and according to Philip Melancthon (letter to Joachim Camerarius, 17 April 1525) Storch played a leading role in the Peasants War of 1525.

Löhner's first stay in Hof was also short-lived and Head Pastor Friedrich von Brandenburg had him removed the year after he arrived (1525) and he was replaced by the Catholic priest Wolfgang Thech. On Easter of 1527 Thech had his beard and hair purposely set on fire by young men while he was impersonating Christ in a Harrowing of Hell re-enactment. Believing they had been taught to disrespect the priesthood by men like Löhner, Thech left Hof for Halle an der Saale.

After time in Wittenberg (1526) and then Oelzntiz (1527) Löhner was then reinstated in 1528 in Hof by Friedrich's Lutheran brother the Margrave George the Pious. Löhner then returned to Hof in league with the Hof born theologian, mathematician, and school master Nikolaus Medler (who was also a student of Luther's). Together they more boldly introduced the Reformation. The first Evangelical (Lutheran) communion service in Hof was held by Löhner at St. Michaeliskirche on September 5, 1529. This public act marks a major turning point in which Hof began to assert itself as openly Lutheran against the jurisdiction of the Catholic Church. However, Löhner and Medler continued to face stiff opposition to these changes as their subsequent removal from Hof reveals.

Pastor Kaspar Löhner was a leading theologian and writer in his day and he wrote a church liturgy, catechism, and a hymnal among other writings. While in Hof he married Margarethe Felitscher, daughter of the Mayor (Bürgermeister) of Hof Konrad Felitscher, and by which he became the father of John Joshua Löner and the great-grandfather of the famous Lutheran theologian and hymn writer Joshua Stegmann.

Löhner and Medler both continued to receive opposition from powerful individuals including the regional governor Christoph von Beulwitz who was a supporter of the Bishop of Bamberg. Being acquainted with Martin Luther, both Pastor Löhner and Schoolmaster Medler asked him for advice concerning this opposition and received a letter from Luther addressed from Wittenberg on June 7, 1531 which encouraged them to stay. The letter begins:

""

Translation: "[From] Martin Luther, to the venerable brothers in Christ and faithful citizens of the city of Hof, Kaspar Löner, Pastor, and Nicholas Medler, School Master."However, the next month (13 July 1531) both Löhner and Medler were ousted from Hof. This is due to the fact that even though George the Pious was actively trying to introduce Protestantism into his lands, he was constantly opposed by his brother Friedrich who held numerous benefices in Hof. Also still holding great influence and power in and around Hof was the Bishop of Bamberg Weigand von Redwitz. These two were able to somewhat curb the influence of Margrave George the Pious and the reformers.

However, the next year, in 1532, George the Pious was able to obtain the famous theologian and reformer Stephan Agricola and assign him to St. Michaeliskirche in Hof.  Also during the year 1532 there was public shock throughout Hof as a local noblewoman who had become a nun (Veronika von Zedtwitz) left the Poor Clares' cloister in Hof and broke her vows to marry the rector of the Gymnasium in Hof, Conrad Meyer. Pastor Agricola continued his influential ministry in Hof until 1542 and during his time as Hof's pastor he was present at the meeting of Lutheran theologians at Schmalkalden in 1537 and was a signer of the Schmalkaldic Articles written by Martin Luther.

It was during this time period that the Catholic population in Hof became severely limited, although it held on for a few more decades. In 1538 the Sigmundskirche was demolished and the St. Gangolf church was sold (and was later burned down and turned into barns). After the Franciscan monastery was abolished in Hof in 1564, Catholicism did not really regain ground in the city again until after Catholic Bavaria purchased Franconia in 1810. It wasn't until 1837 that the Catholic population of Hof received their own priest and 1844 until a small church was built (Marienkirche).

Margrave Albert Alcibiades 

In 1546, Margrave Albert Alcibiades of Brandenburg-Kulmbach founded a Grammar School in Hof, which is today known as the Jean-Paul Gymnasium, in honor of the most famous student that attended there: Jean Paul Friedrich Richter. Jean-Paul Gymnasium is one of the oldest schools in Upper Franconia.

Siege of Hof 
On August 7, 1553 Hof came under a 7-week siege known as the Siege of Hof. The siege was one of the major battles of the Second Margrave War and Hof was finally taken from Margrave Albert Alcibiades by Heinrich IV of Plauen on September 28, 1553. Albert was able to briefly retake Hof on October 11, but it fell back into the hands of those allied against Margrave Albert on November 27. Some 18,236 stone cannonballs are said to have been shot into Hof during this siege with some cannonballs still visible today lodged in walls throughout Hof. For example, from the Saale River looking back one can still see a cannonball lodged in one of the towers of St. Michaeliskirche from the siege of 1553.

Aftermath: St. Lorenzkirche was looted and burned during the siege and the old Watch Tower was also burned out. The Hospitalkirche, which was used as a war camp by the attackers, was attacked and destroyed by the city's defenders. Also, the end of the last Roman Catholic stronghold in Hof;  occurred during this siege as Abbess Amalie of Hirschberg escaped with her nuns to Cheb (Eger). The Cloister was looted and later turned into a school. After the siege, Henry IV briefly put Georg Wolf of Kotzau (who had once served Margrave Albert) in charge of the governance of Hof. Finally, Albert's cousin, Margrave Jürgen Friedrich of Brandenburg-Ansbach (reign of 1557–1603) took power and ruled over Hof and rebuilt it along with much of his Margraviate which had been ransacked during the war.

The noted artist Hans Glaser made a woodcut of the siege of Hof which is located in today in the Germanisches Nationalmuseum in Nürnberg.

Thirty Years War (1618 – 1648)

Regional Prelude: Brandenburg-Ansbach to Brandenburg-Bayreuth 
After the death of the childless Margrave Jürgen Friedrich of Brandenburg-Ansbach in 1603, his margraviate was given to Karsten, the son of Elector Johann Jürgen of Brandenburg. This was done in accordance with House Treaty of Gera set in place in 1599 to provide for a peaceful transition of power to the heirless Jürgen Friedrich.

Margrave Karsten took power over Brandenburg-Ansbach after Jürgen Friedrich’s death in 1603. In 1604, he moved his capital from Kulmbach to Bayreuth, thus changing the name of the margraviate to Brandenburg-Bayreuth. This Margraviate had been a member of the Franconian Circle since 1500 and Margrave Karsten was elected Colonel of the Franconian Circle in 1606. He was also one of the founding members of the Protestant Union founded in 1608 as a way of giving teeth to the Peace of Augsburg (1555). Karsten was Margrave of Brandenbug-Bayreuth which oversaw the governance of Hof when the 30 Years War broke out ten years later in 1618.

Fire of 1625 
On November 6 a fire broke out in Hof that destroyed 174 houses. Hof was again left destitute and it took 40 years before widespread re-construction could be financed. During this time period Hof was left vulnerable, especially to the pillaging of the mercenary Heinrich Holk's notorious cavalry unit, "Holk's Horse" (see below).

Heinrich Holk's Raids 
In 1632 and 33 Heinrich Holk's cavalry unit of Croatian and Polish forces ravaged the surrounding region (especially the neighboring Electorate of Saxony). On 23 Jan 1633, 8 companies of Holk's Horse plundered Hof. The raiding, raping, looting, and destruction continued also in later raids on June 13 and August 11 of the same year. Fortunately for the distraught citizens of Hof Heinrich Holk's forces were politically stymied after the Battle of Lützen on November 16.

Margrave karsten in the War and Aftermath 
During the war, Margrave Karsten formed an alliance with Sweden, although the Swedes sacked Hof on 29 May 1640. Emperor Ferdinand II tried to depose him as ruler of Bayreuth in 1635; however, he continued in office. All of Europe was deeply affected by these wars. Disease, starvation, and warfare took a terrible toll on infrastructure, livestock, farmlands, and human dignity. After the 30 Years War it is estimated that one half of the population of Brandenburg was lost and in some areas as many as two-thirds. One can only imagine the joy when the wars ended and Margrave Karsten called a general festival of thanksgiving for peace which was celebrated throughout his Principality in February 1639. Hof seems to have recovered quickly under Margrave Karsten and it became a refuge for displaced Protestants, especially from Austria and Bohemia.

Postal Link 
In 1683 Hof became a link in the postal service between Leipzig and Nuremberg. The post came through twice a week. Postal links to Regensburg (1692) and to Dresden (1693) followed.

Fire of 1743 
In 1743 the Hof Castle burned down and was not rebuilt, although several walls of the castle are still visible in modern-day Hof.

Prussian Rule (1791 – 1805) 
Hof came under Prussian rule on December 2, 1791 when Margrave Karl Alexander, the last Margrave of Brandenburg-Ansbach and Brandenburg-Bayreuth, sold it to King Friedrich Wilhelm II of Prussia, a fellow member of the House Hohenzollern.

Napoleonic Conflicts (1805 – 1810) 
On November 3, 1805 the Prussians had signed the Treaty of Potsdam, agreeing to enter the War of the Third Coalition against Napoleon if he didn't agree to peace within four weeks. This treaty came to nothing after the Battle of Austerlitz on December 2, 1805, when Napoleon decisively crushed the Third Coalition. This forced the Prussian envoy, Count Karsten of Haugwitz, to negotiate a treaty of friendship called the Convention of Schönbrunn (15 December 1805) proclaiming an alliance between Prussia and France. As part of this treaty Prussia was forced to give up Brandenburg-Ansbach.

In February 1806 Haugwitz went to Paris to ratify this Treaty of Schönbrunn and to attempt to secure some modifications in favour of Prussia. He was received with a storm of abuse by Napoleon, who insisted on tearing up the treaty and drawing up a fresh one, which doubled the amount of territory to be ceded by Prussia and forced her to a breach with Great Britain by binding her to close the Hanoverian ports to British commerce. The treaty, signed on 15 February, left Prussia wholly isolated in Europe and led Prussia into war with Napoleon later that year.

In the War of the Fourth Coalition (1806–1807) Hof was then briefly held by General Bogislav Friedrich Emanuel von Tauentzien of the Prussian Army. Tauentzein more or less abandoned Hof on October 8, 1806 and Hof was easily taken by light cavalry from Napoleon's Marshal General Jean-de-Dieu Soult's IV Corps that same day. Hof's geographic position made it an ideal 'jumping off' point of Napoleon's Campaign in Saxony which quickly resulted in the French-won Battle of Schleiz the next day and soon thereafter the famous Napoleon victory at the Battle of Jena.

Napoleon sold Hof to the Kingdom of Bavaria on June 30, 1810.

Bavarian Rule (1810 – 1918)

Fire of 1823 
On September 4, 1823, the town was virtually destroyed by a fire as 9 out of 10 buildings were destroyed.

World War II 
In 1945, Hof suffered minor destruction due to aerial attacks but by the end of 1945 housed twice its previous population, receiving German-speaking refugees from neighboring Bohemia, where extensive ethnic cleansing of Czechoslovakia's German-speaking population was taking place.

Modern Era 
From 1945 to 1990 Hof lay very close to the border between East Germany and West Germany.
In 1989 thousands of East German citizens, who had demanded the right to travel or emigrate to West Germany and had been allowed to do so, first arrived on western soil at Hof's railway station, having been placed on a special train and officially "expelled" by the East German government. Hof is located near the old Berlin-Munich autobahn, which was thought to be a possible invasion route by Warsaw Pact forces had the Cold War ever escalated into armed conflict (see Fulda Gap).

Population development

Politics

Margraves of Kulmbach and Bayreuth 
 1398: Johann III of Nuremberg
 1420: Friedrich I of Brandenburg
 1440: Johann IV the Alchemist
 1457: Albert I Achilles (also Margrave of Brandenburg from 1470)
 1486: Siegmund
 1495: Friedrich III (also Margrave of Ansbach as Friedrich I)
 1515: Kasimir
 1527: Albert Alcibiades
 1553: Jürgen Friedrich (also Margrave of Ansbach)
 1603: Karsten
 1655: Karsten Ernst
 1712: Jürgen Wilhelm
 1726: Jürgen Friedrich Karl (previously Margrave of Kulmbach from 1708)
 1735: Friedrich
 1763: Friedrich Karsten
 1769: Karsten Friedrich (to 1791; also Margrave of Ansbach)

Mayors (first mayors and lord mayors)
(since the introduction of the Bavarian Municipal Code in 1818)

Twin towns – sister cities

Hof is twinned with:

 Cheb, Czech Republic
 Joensuu, Finland
 Ogden, United States
 Plauen, Germany
 Villeneuve-la-Garenne, France

Culture

Points of interest 
 Botanischer Garten der Stadt Hof, a municipal botanical garden and the Hof Zoo, a zoological garden located on the Theresienstein, a hill near the downtown
 Freiheitshalle, event building
 St Mary's Cathedral, highest church of the town (65 meters high)
 St Michel's Cathedral, second largest church
 Untreusee, a lake in the south of the town

Concert, theatre and Festivals 
 Freiheitshalle, the biggest hall for Events and concerts in north-east Bavaria, famous for TV-shows and trade fairs, with a capacity of more than 6,000 people.
 Theater Hof, a multi-purpose theatre, serves as an opera house and drama theatre. It hosts also the city's ballet company and a youth theatre. Intendant: Reinhardt Friese.
 Hofer Symphoniker, the symphony orchestra of Hof, plays as opera orchestra at the theatre and gives concerts at the Freiheitshalle Hof. Notable is also the Hofer Symphoniker Music School, which is unique among Germany's professional orchestras. Intendant: Ingrid Schrader.
 Church music at City churches St Mary's and St Michel's. Music direktors: Ludger Stühlmeyer and Georg Stanek.
 International Violin Competition Henri Marteau: Named after the famous violinist and violin teacher Henri Marteau, the competition takes place under the responsibility of the District of Upper Franconia and organized by Hofer Symphoniker every three years in Lichtenberg and Hof.
 Hof International Film Festival: Wim Wenders once said HOF was short for Home of Films. In 1967, student Heinz Badewitz, together with his then-band members, organized a two and a half hour "movie theater night" in Hof showing a few short motion pictures. They called this event the 1st Hof Short Film Festival. They had the idea after disappointing results at the Obberhausener Short Film Festival. Also, Munich (the city where they studied at the time) had too difficult terms and conditions and the rents had been too high to start a project of that kind there. This gave way for the Hof International Film Festival. Heinz Badewith led the Festival from there on and the project grew up over the years. Now, after four decades, the Festival is one of the most renowned in all of Germany. Newcomer directors and producers get to premier their debut motion pictures here. The Hof International Film Festival became a trend-setting event for the German movie industry.
 Schlappentag (see above in the general description)
 Hofer Volksfest: The term  means fair or folk festival. The Hofer Volksfest is the biggest of its kind in the area. It takes place at the end of July and beginning of August every year. It always begins on the last Friday of July with a big parade which passes through the downtown heading in the direction of the festival area where it finishes up. The festival occupies a big amusement park with a wide variety of attractions and all kinds of local food and beer specialties, and partly occupies a big beer tent area. Most of the latter takes place in a big concert hall but the atmosüphere is similar to that of a beer tent. Every night, different local bands play mostly traditional Bavarian music to entertain the mostly regional crowd. In the late 60s Andy Seltzer originally found Luise Miehling at this event.

Weather and geography
Hof is also known as Bavarian Siberia because temperatures are usually a few degrees lower than in most other parts of Bavaria, particularly in winter, but summers are very warm. Another point is that civil servants were often transferred to Hof as a punishment in older times.

Wargamers might know Hof from the game Hof Gap published by Simulations Publications, Inc. (SPI) in 1980. The game, which simulates the early stages of WWIII in Germany, was not well received in Hof itself. SPI confused Hof Gap with the Fulda Gap, further north. Operationally Hof was in the US Army's 2nd Squadron/2nd Armored Cavalry's sector, maintaining border operations in this region, and it was referred to as the Hof Corridor. A letter to SPI in early 1981 did not persuade them to change the name of the game, however. Despite that, the game was popular among 2/2 ACR troopers who enjoyed conflict simulations.

Actually, the Hof Gap was also a planned Warsaw Pact approach into West Germany. There are many published post-Cold War articles supporting this. The anticipated actions in defense of West Germany included the cavalry covering force action which was to delay, allowing the arrival of US and Bundeswehr heavy units. SPI made no error or confusion in this case and actually covered a less well known, but just as critical, possible Soviet approach route. The layman who was interested in the 70's and 80's knew about Fulda, only those assigned to relieve the cavalry at Hof were aware of its importance. Review of the unit designations in both the Fulda and Hof Gap games SPI released and their coverage becomes readily apparent.

An interesting note about the coat-of-arms of Hof is that it is a red shield with two white towers against which leans a black shield with a gold lion. 322 miles away the town of Heimbach where Hengebach castle is located (former capital of the Duchy of Jülich) the coat-of-arms is almost the reverse: a black shield with a red roof on a white tower against which leans a gold shield with a black lion. Although Hof is 322 miles away from Heimbach, the two cities do have some interesting associations. The castle of Hengebach in Heimbach is actually located in the section that was the former village of Schmidt and there lived a branch of the baronial dynasty of von Schmidt auf Altenstadt until they emigrated in 1749 and the seat of the barons von Altenstadt was very near Hof, in a part of the municipality of Gattendorf known as Kirchgattendorf, where the ruins of the von Altenstadt castles can be seen today. But the coincidences do not stop there: the family arms of the von Schmidts auf Altenstadt were a swan and the arms of Gattendorf are a swan.

The barons von Schmidt auf Altenstadt, as barons of the village Gattendorf in the environs of Hof were a significant part of social and aristocratic life in Hof. In the nineteenth century, Christoph August von Schmidt, after having served as a Provost at the University of Saint Petersburg, Russia where he was ennobled by the Tsar and awarded the orders of St Stanislaus and Sts Ann-and-Vladimir, erected a monument describing his adventure and bearing the simplified, swan version of his coat-of-arms which today has been adopted by the village of Gattendorf as its municipal arms.

Hof provided Anthony Hope (author of "The Prisoner of Zenda") with his inspiration for Strelsau, capital of his fictitious kingdom of Ruritania. Although the book locates Ruritania along the railway line between Dresden in Sachsen (Saxony) and Prague, capital of Bohemia (modern day Czech Republic), one can see Hof in the descriptions of Strelsau. Among the clues there is the name "Altstadt" for the "old town"—similar to —the older part of Strelsau where "Black Michael", the Duke of Strelsau, was popular. And one can see elements of Hof's medieval beauty in the atmosphere of Strelsau.

Climate 
Climate in this area has mild differences between highs and lows, and there is adequate rainfall year-round. The Köppen Climate Classification subtype for this climate is "Cfb" (Marine West Coast Climate/Oceanic climate).

Education 
Hof is also home to the University of Applied Sciences Hof which has around 3700 students and the University of Applied Sciences for Administration and Legal Affairs in Bavaria which has around 1800 students.

Media 
In Hof is the headquarters of the Frankenpost, the regional newspaper.

There are two radio stations Radio Euroherz and Extra Radio.

Furthermore are the studios of the regional television channel  (TV Upper-Franconia) in Hof.

Athletes mourn Gustav Eck.
Gustav Eck, who was one of the best Hofer sprinters in the late 1950s and early 1960s, died at the age of 83. Eck, who started for the SpVgg Hof at the time, remains unforgotten for the Hofer athletes as the final runner in the legendary May relay races. In 1958, 1959 and 1960 he led his team to victory in a thrilling finish on Ludwigstrasse in front of an unbelievable 10,000 spectators. according to older press reports, the audience broke through the cordons at the destination town hall in ludwigstrasse with enthusiasm to celebrate the Staffellaeufer. The era of large relay races across Hof ended with the 17th edition on May 1, 1967. Gustav Eck is in the rankings with the best time of 11.1 seconds, although at that time people almost only ran on ash with long spikes.

Military 
Hof was of special interest during the Cold War as it was near the border with Czechoslovakia and the GDR. On Hohe Saas, there was a radar site. A border camp of the American 2nd Armored Cavalry Regiment was near the town. The 511th Military Intelligence Battalion also maintained a border resident office in Hof*. Between 1949 and 1993, Hof was also the site of an RIAS transmitting station.
 Source - page 132 - https://history.army.mil/documents/BorderOps/ch5.htm

Transport 
Hof central station is on the Regensburg–Hof, Bamberg–Hof and Leipzig–Hof main lines and the Hof–Bad Steben branch line.

Buses are run by HofBus, which currently runs 12 lines in the town.

Hof has a regional airport.

Notable people

Born in Hof
 Nikolaus Decius (1485–after 1546), monk, minister, cantor, hymns poet and Prussian reformer
 Johann Christian Reinhart (1761–1847), painter, etcher and draftsman
 Johann Georg August Wirth (1798–1848), journalist and political activist
 Johann Erhard Fischer (1817–1884), pastor, historian, author and editor of Freimund's kirchlich-politisches Wochenblatt für Stadt und Land
 Heinrich Gerber (1832–1912), civil engineer, bridge-builder and inventor of the Gerber girder
 Otto von Schrön (1837–1917), physician, epidemiologist, Director of the Institute of Pathological Anatomy at the University of Naples, freeman of Naples

 Otto von Lossow (1868–1938), General, commander of the Infantry School in Munich
 Ernst Pöhner (1870–1925), Munich Police President and one of the parties at the Hitler Ludendorff Putsch in 1923
 Stefan Dittrich (1912–1988), politician (CSU), member of the Bundestag
 Gerhard Hetz (1942–2012), float and swim coach
 Klaus Wedemeier (born 1944), SPD - politician, 1971–1985 and 1995–1999 member of the Bremen Regional Parliament (Landtag), 1985–1995 mayor and president of the Senate of Bremen
 Reinhard Kapp (born 1947), musicologist
 Daniel Felgenhauer (born 1976), football player
 Mergim Vojvoda (born 1995), Kosovan football player
Gustav Eck,  Athletes mourn Gustav Eck.
Gustav Eck, who was one of the best Hofer sprinters in the late 1950s and early 1960s, died at the age of 83. Eck, who started for the SpVgg Hof at the time, remains unforgotten for the Hofer athletes as the final runner in the legendary May relay races. In 1958, 1959 and 1960 he led his team to victory in a thrilling finish on Ludwigstrasse in front of an unbelievable 10,000 spectators. according to older press reports, the audience broke through the cordons at the destination town hall in ludwigstrasse with enthusiasm to celebrate the Staffellaeufer. The era of large relay races across Hof ended with the 17th edition on May 1, 1967. Gustav Eck is in the rankings with the best time of 11.1 seconds, although at that time people almost only ran on ash with long spikes.

Those associated with Hof 
 Stephan Agricola (1491–1547), theologian and reformer in Hof
 Paul Daniel Longolius (1704–1779), rector of the school in Hof, chief editor of Zedler Universal Lexicon
 Jean Paul (1763–1825), writer, visited the school in Hof
 Bernhard Lichtenberg (1875–1943), Catholic priest who took a position critical during the Nazi era, died on the way to Dachau concentration camp in court. Was awarded for his commitment to persecuted Jews in the Israeli memorial Yad Vashem as "Righteous Among the Nations" (memorial bust in the Parish Church of St. Mary)
 Leo Götz (1883–1962), painter, died in Hof
 Richard Wendler (1898–1972) mayor in Hof
 Hans Hofner (1908–1982), local historian, winner of the Golden Ring of Honour of the city Hof
 Enoch zu Guttenberg (1946–2018), honorary conductor of the Hofer Symphoniker
 Hans-Peter Friedrich (born 1957), German politician of the CSU, former Interior Minister
 Ludger Stühlmeyer (born 1961), deanerycantor, docent, musicologist and composer
 Barbara Stühlmeyer (born 1964), author, scientist, church musician
 Alfredo Stroessner (1912–2006) 42nd president of Paraguay's father, Hugo Strößner was from Hof

References

Literature 
 Chronik der Stadt Hof, Band I-X,  (Chronicle of the City Court, Volume I-X, publication of Hof, Mintzel pressure Hof 1937-1997):
 Band I, Hof 1937, Ernst Dietlein: .
 Band II, Hof 1939, Ernst Dietlein: .
 Band III, Hof 1942, Ernst Dietlein: .
 Band IV, Hof 1955, Ernst Dietlein: .
 Band V, Hof 1957, Friedrich Ebert: .
 Band VI, Hof 1966, Friedrich Ebert, Karl Waelzel: .
 Band VII/1, Hof 1979, Dietmar Trautmann: .
 Band VIII, Hof 1936, Ernst Dietlein: .
 Band IX, Hof 1997, Rudolf Müller, Carola Friedmann, Adelheid Weißer: .
 Band X, Hof 2005, Jörg Wurdack: .
 Christoph Rabenstein:  Hof 1918-1924. Hagens Antiquariatsbuchhandlung, Bayreuth 1986.
 Friedrich Ebert, Axel Herrmann: . Hoermann Verlag, Hof 1988, .
 Peter Nürmberger, Reinhard Feldrapp: . Hoermann Verlag, Hof 2002, .
 Arnd Kluge, Beatrix Münzer-Glas: . Sutton Verlag, Erfurt 2007, .
 Ludger Stühlmeyer:   ( - The musical history of the city court. With biographies of musicians who were born in the yard or have worked here.) Phil.Diss., Bayerische Verlagsanstalt, Heinrichs-Verlag, Bamberg 2010, .

 Homepage of Evangelical Deanery yard
 Hof, described by a native Franconian resident (in English)
 Zodwa Selele

 
Towns in Bavaria